Slavovitsa is a village located in the Septemvri Municipality of Pazardzhik Province, Bulgaria. It is the birthplace of former Bulgarian prime minister Aleksandar Stamboliyski.

References

Villages in Pazardzhik Province